The black-crowned monjita (Neoxolmis coronatus) is a species of bird in the family Tyrannidae.
It is found in Argentina, Bolivia, Brazil, Paraguay, and Uruguay.
Its natural habitat is subtropical or tropical dry shrubland.

Taxonomy
This species was formerly placed in the genus Xolmis. Following the publication of a molecular phylogenetic study in 2020, it was one of three species moved to Neoxolmis.

References

black-crowned monjita
Birds of Argentina
black-crowned monjita
Taxa named by Louis Jean Pierre Vieillot
Taxonomy articles created by Polbot
Taxobox binomials not recognized by IUCN